Courtyard (Italian: Cortile) is a 1931 Italian drama film directed by Carlo Campogalliani and starring Augusto Contardi, Dria Paola and Ettore Petrolini. It was the director's first sound film, and was made after he returned from working in South America for several years.

It was made at the Cines Studios in Rome.

Cast
 Augusto Contardi as No name  
 Dria Paola as Maria 
 Ettore Petrolini as Il cantante girovago cieco

References

Bibliography
 Moliterno, Gino. The A to Z of Italian Cinema. Scarecrow Press, 2009.

External links

1931 films
1931 drama films
Italian drama films
1930s Italian-language films
Films directed by Carlo Campogalliani
Cines Studios films
Italian black-and-white films
1930s Italian films